Derecik is a municipality (belde) and the seat of Derecik District in Hakkâri Province of Turkey. It is populated by Kurds of the Gerdî tribe and had a population of 11,264 in 2021.

The municipality was depopulated in the 1990s during the Kurdish–Turkish conflict.

Neighborhoods 
Derecik municipality is divided into the nine quarters of Merkez, Balkaya, Güney, Hacıbey, Orta, Üçyan, Gürmeşe, Rize and Vapurtepe.

Population 
Population history of the municipality from 2000 to 2022:

Reference 

Kurdish settlements in Hakkâri Province
Populated places in Hakkâri Province